A command information newspaper is an unofficial written publication directly funded by the United States Department of Defense. It may contain news, information and advertising, and is usually printed on low-cost paper called newsprint. Editorial views expressed in command information newspapers may not necessarily be those of the Department of Defense.

Newspapers published in the United States